Salvatore Bocchetti (born 30 November 1986) is an Italian football coach and former player who is the assistant coach of  club Hellas Verona. He played as a centre-back as a player.

Club career
Bocchetti started his professional career at Ascoli. He made his Serie A debut against Palermo on 20 December 2006.
He was sent on loan to Serie C1 for Lanciano, and Frosinone of Serie B on second half of 2006–07 season. In the 2008–09 season Bocchetti was signed by Genoa and soon became a regular starter in central defence, also functioning as a fullback on occasion.

In the 2010–2011 season he was signed by Rubin Kazan on a 3.5-year contract with a fee reported to be around €15 million for the transfer. On 2 October 2011 Bocchetti scored two goals in a league match against Tom Tomsk. Kazan won the game 2–0. In January 2013, he moved to Spartak Moscow, another Russian Premier League club. In August 2013, he received a knee surgery and missed the rest of the season. On 27 January 2015, Milan had signed him on loan with an option to make the move permanent at the end of the season. He was released from his Spartak contract by mutual consent on 6 July 2019.

On 25 July 2019, Bocchetti signed to Italian Serie A club Hellas Verona a 2-years contract.

On 29 September 2020, Bocchetti joined Serie B club Pescara on loan until 30 June 2021.

International career
In March 2008, Bocchetti made his debut with the Italy U-21 squad. He established himself in Pierluigi Casiraghi's Azzurrini squad which won the 2008 Toulon Tournament, and retained his place in the starting line up for the Summer Olympics, as Italy reached the quarter-finals. Together with Marco Andreolli, he was first-choice in central defence during the 2009 U-21 European Championship as Italy reached the semi-finals; he was later named to the team of the tournament.

On 22 March 2009, Bocchetti received his first call up to the senior Italy squad for two World Cup qualifiers matches but remained an unused substitute. On 10 October 2009 he made his senior national team international debut against Ireland coming on as a second-half substitute in Croke Park. He was named in Marcello Lippi's 23-men squad for the 2010 World Cup. Bocchetti was also selected for Italy's preliminary squad for Euro 2012, but was not picked for the final squad.

Style of play
Bocchetti has been described as a versatile, left-footed centre back, who is also capable of being deployed as a full back. He is known for his strength, pace, and anticipation, as well for his reliable technical ability.

Coaching career
Following his retirement from active football, Bocchetti took on a career as a coach, rejoining Verona in July 2021 as a youth coach in charge of the Under-18 team. He left his role later in September 2021 to join Igor Tudor's first team coaching staff as an assistant, and also taking Tudor's place for a single Serie A league game against Cagliari on 30 April 2022 as Tudor himself was disqualified.

Following Tudor's departure and the appointment of Gabriele Cioffi as new head coach, Bocchetti was then handed over the duties of the Under-19 team for the 2022–23 season. In September 2022, he obtained a UEFA A license.

On 13 October 2022, he was promoted head coach of Verona, replacing Gabriele Cioffi. As Bocchetti had no UEFA Pro license at the time of his appointment, Verona had to ask the Italian Football Federation to hand him a temporary authorization, which was handed for a period of 30 days. He guided Verona formally as head coach for a total six games, all of them ending with defeat.

On 3 December 2022, after his temporary authorization to coach the Gialloblu expired, Verona announced the appointment of Marco Zaffaroni as new head coach, with Bocchetti as his assistant.

Personal life
Bocchetti is married to Ekaterina Maltseva, a Russian woman he met during his time at Spartak, and has three children. He is fluent in Italian, English, Spanish and Russian.

Career statistics

Notes

Honours

Club
Rubin Kazan
Russian Cup: 2011–12
Russian Super Cup: 2012

Spartak Moscow
Russian Premier League: 2016–17
Russian Super Cup: 2017

International
Italy U-21
Toulon Tournament: 2008

Individual
2009 UEFA European under-21 Championship Team of the Tournament

References

External links
Profile on Genoa official website
Profile on FIGC website 
OFFICIAL: Rubin Kazan Sign Salvatore Bocchetti From Genoa Goal.com

Living people
1986 births
Footballers from Naples
Association football central defenders
Italian footballers
Ascoli Calcio 1898 F.C. players
S.S. Virtus Lanciano 1924 players
Frosinone Calcio players
Genoa C.F.C. players
FC Rubin Kazan players
FC Spartak Moscow players
Hellas Verona F.C. players
Delfino Pescara 1936 players
Serie A players
Serie B players
Serie C players
Russian Premier League players
Italy under-21 international footballers
Italy youth international footballers
Olympic footballers of Italy
Footballers at the 2008 Summer Olympics
Italy international footballers
2010 FIFA World Cup players
Italian expatriate footballers
Expatriate footballers in Russia
Italian expatriate sportspeople in Russia
Italian football managers
Hellas Verona F.C. managers
Serie A managers